Michael Ndubuisi Onwatuegwu (born June 10, 1987, in Onitsha, Anambra State) is a Nigerian soccer player who currently for Gresik United.

References

External links

1987 births
Living people
Sportspeople from Onitsha
Nigerian expatriate footballers
Nigerian expatriate sportspeople in Indonesia
Nigerian footballers
Expatriate soccer players in Canada
Expatriate footballers in Indonesia
Association football defenders
Vancouver Whitecaps (1986–2010) players
USSF Division 2 Professional League players
Persis Solo players
Indonesian Premier Division players